The Potez 62 was a French twin-engine civil airliner, designed by Henry Potez in 1934. The French military adapted this airframe two-years later to create the Potez 650.

History
The prototype of the Potez 62 made its maiden flight on 28 January 1935. The aircraft had been developed from the Potez 54 bomber and was constructed as a high-wing monoplane.

The wooden fuselage had a composite coating, whereas the wings were covered with fabric and the leading edge was made out of metal. The aircraft was propelled by two Gnôme & Rhône radial engines whose 14 cylinders produced some 870 hp. The engines were mounted in two side cradles, fixed to the fuselage and to the wings.

The cabin was divided into two compartments and could accommodate 14 to 16 people. A version equipped with Hispano-Suiza V-engines was ordered by Air France in 1936. These were used on routes inside South America. By late 1936, many Potez 62s were employed on routes to Europe and the Far East, as the aircraft was robust and reliable, albeit slow. It remained in service until the Second World War, and one was used by the Free French Air Force.

Variants
Potez 620
Twin-engined civil airliner, powered by 1x  Gnome-Rhône 14Kirs Mistral Major + 1x  Gnome-Rhône 14Kjrs Mistral Major radial engines (LH & RH rotation). Also designated Potez 62-0.
Potez 621
Improved version of the Potez 62, powered by 1x  Hispano-Suiza 12Xirs + 1x  Hispano-Suiza 12Xijrs liquid-cooled V12 engines (LH & RH rotation). Also designated Potez 62-1.

Operators

Air France
Free French Air Force

LARES

Pluna

Specifications (Potez 620)

See also
 List of aircraft of World War II
 List of aircraft of the French Air Force during World War II

References

Further reading

 
 
"For Air France: The Potez 62: Cruising Speed of 175 mph with Fourteen Passengers". Flight, 21 March 1935, p. 304.

1930s French airliners
062
High-wing aircraft
Aircraft first flown in 1935
Twin piston-engined tractor aircraft